Acqua may refer to:

Places
Acqua Fraggia or Acquafraggia, a short and frequently steep torrente (Italian: seasonal stream), in the province of Sondrio in Lombardy, north Italy

People
 Antonio Acqua (November 1910 - 18 October 1976), Italian actor of the 1940s, 1950s and 1960s
 Camillo Acqua (30 August 1863 - 25 March 1936), Italian entomologist
 Robert Acquafresca, Italian footballer
 Stefano Dall'Acqua, Italian footballer
 Simone Dell'Acqua, Italian footballer

Aqueducts

Ancient Rome
 Aqua Alexandrina, span: Pantano Borghese to the Baths of Alexander on the Campus Martius
Aqua Alsietina, built in 2 BC, span: Lake Alsietina, now Lake Martignano, northwest of Rome to the Naumachia of Augustus in Transtiberim (Trastevere)
 Aqua Anio Novus, built in AD 52, span: Anio (Aniene) River, east of Rome to the Caelian Hill
 Aqua Anio Vetus, built in 272 - 269 BC, span: the Anio (Aniene) River near Vicovaro, east of Rome to the Viminal Hill
 Aqua Antoniniana, a branch of Aqua Marcia that pipes to the Baths of Caracalla on the Caelian Hill, then to the Aventine Hill and the Quirinal Hill
 Aqua Appia, completed in 311 B.C., span: the springs 10 miles (16 km) to the east of Rome to the Forum Boarium in Campus Martius
 Aqua Claudia, built in AD 52, span: the springs in Subiaco, east of Rome to Caelian Hill, later piped to the imperial palaces from the mid-first century on the Palatine Hill
 Aqua Julia, built in 33 BC, span: the springs near Subiaco, east of Rome to the Aventine Hill
 Aqua Marcia, built in 144 - 140 BC; span: the springs near Subiaco, east of Rome to the Capitoline Hill (the longest of the 11 aqueducts that supplied the city of ancient Rome)
 Aqua Tepula, completed in 125 BC, span: the springs near Subiaco, east of Rome, then on the same arches as those of the Aqua Marcia to the Aventine Hill
 Aqua Traiana (later rebuilt and named Acqua Paola), built in AD 109, span: the springs to the north of Lake Bracciano, northwest of Rome to Janiculum Hill
 Aqua Virgo, built in 19 BC, span: the springs near Via Collatina, east of Rome to the baths of Agrippa in Campus Martius

Modern Rome
 Acqua Appio-Allesandrino, completed in 1965, span: catchment basins along the volcano Angela at Pantano Borghese, Finocchi, Torre Angela
 Acqua Felice, completed in 1586, origin/terminus: the springs at Pantano Borghese, off Via Casilin to the fountain of Moses on the Quirinal Hill
 Acqua Paola, completed in 1611, span: Lake Bracciano, northwest of Rome to the fountain of Paul V on the Janiculum Hill, later piped to Vatican Hill
 Acqua Peschiera, completed in 1949, span: the springs in Sorgenti, northeast of Rome, branching to two termini, Peschiera Sinistra, approaching Rome from the east, and Peschiera Destra, taking a westward route to its terminus at the fountain of Piazzale degli Eroi, just north of Vatican Hill
 Acqua Pia Antica Marcia, completed in 1870, span: the springs near Subiaco, east of Rome to the fountain of the Naiads on the Viminal Hill; first built as a restoration of the classical Aqua Marcia
 Acqua Vergine, one of several Roman aqueducts that delivers pure drinking water to Rome; its name derives from its predecessor, Acqua Virgo
 Acqua Vergine Antica, completed in 1453, span: the springs in Salone, east of Rome to the fountain of Trevi on the Quirinal Hill
 Acqua Vergine Nuova, completed in 1937; span: the springs in Salone, east of Rome to its terminus the fountains in Piazza del Popolo and the fountains on the western slope of the Pincio, overlooking Piazza del Popolo

Businesses and organizations
Acqua & Sapone, a professional continental cycling team based in Italy that participated in UCI Europe Tour
Acqua Limone, a Swedish clothing brand
Acqua di Parma, an Italian lifestyle company that produces fragrances, candles, bathrobes and leather accessories
Acqua Santa Golf Club Course, a golf course in Rome, Italy

Other uses
Acqua alta, (Italian: "high water"), the term used in Veneto for the exceptional tide peaks that occur periodically in the northern Adriatic Sea. The most known place where "acqua alta" occurs is Venice.
Aqua Tofana, a strong poison

See also
Acqua pazza (disambiguation)
Aquatic (disambiguation)